In the year 2009 coins were issued in the series: "History of the Polish Cavalry", "Animals of the World", "Poland’s path to liberation", "History of Polish Popular Music", "Polish Painters" and various occasional coins.

Table of contents

See also

 Numismatics
 Regular issue coinage
 Coin grading

References

Commemorative coins of Poland